A wedding sari is the traditional wedding dress of South Asian women. The sari is traditionally a combination of red and green, with golden brocade. 

Wedding saris are predominantly red, a colour associated with married women, although colours and colour combinations vary by region, caste, and religion; non-Brahmin women in Tamil Nadu wear a red-and-white checked sari as traditional wedding attire. The Padmasali wedding sari is a white sari, dyed with turmeric.

Sari fabric is also traditionally silk. Over time, colour options and fabric choices for Indian brides have expanded. Today fabrics like crêpe, Georgette, tissue, and satin are used, and colours have been expanded to include gold, pink, orange, maroon, brown, and yellow as well. Indian brides in Western countries often wear a sari at the wedding ceremony and change into other traditional Indian wear afterwards such as lehenga, or cholis etc.

Types of wedding saris include Kanchipuram silk sari, Banarasi wedding sari, Sambalpuri sari, Assam silk, Gota sari, Resham sari, Zardosi sari, paithani sari, Bandhani sari, Neriyathum sari.

See also
Indian clothing

References

Further reading
 Boroian, Michael; Poix, Alix de. (2008). India by Design: The Pursuit of Luxury and Fashion. .

Folk costumes
Indian wedding clothing
Saris
Wedding dresses